Centre of excellence or center of excellence may refer to:

Australian Research Council (ARC) Centres of Excellence, Australian and international research collaborations
Center of excellence, a team, shared facility or an organizational entity that concentrates on a focus area
Centre of Excellence on Public Security (CEPS), a think tank based in Rio de Janeiro, Brazil
Cenex, the UK Centre of Excellence for Low Carbon and fuel cell technologies
CERT Group of Companies, the Centre of Excellence for Applied Research and Training
Commonwealth Bank Centre of Excellence, the name for the Australian Cricket Academy
CECT, the Central Institute of Classical Tamil, established by the government of India with a view to promoting the cause of Classical Tamil
Centre of Excellence for Biosecurity Risk Analysis (CEBRA), Melbourne, Australia
EU CBRN Risk Mitigation CoE Initiative, the EU Centres of Excellence on Chemical, Biological, Radiological and Nuclear Risk Mitigation (CBRN CoE) 
NATO Centres of Excellence, an initiative of NATO to request the NATO nations to set up think tank, knowledge development centres